Limnonectes hikidai is a species of fanged frogs in the family Dicroglossidae. It is endemic to Sarawak, East Malaysia (Borneo). Its type locality is Mount Serapi in Kubah National Park, Matang, Kuching District, Sarawak. It is closely related to Limnonectes cintalubang.

References

hikidai
Frogs of Asia
Amphibians of Malaysia
Amphibians of Borneo
Endemic fauna of Malaysia
Endemic fauna of Borneo
Amphibians described in 2014
Taxa named by Masafumi Matsui
Taxa named by Kanto Nishikawa